HMS Ulysses was a 48-gun  fifth-rate frigate of the Royal Navy during the American Revolutionary War and the Napoleonic Wars. Commissioned in 1779, her principal active service was in the Caribbean, interspersed with periods as a troopship and storeship. She was decommissioned and sold at Sheerness Dockyard in 1815.

Career 

On 2 June 1781, Ulysses encountered the 32-gun Fée, under Captain de Boubée. The ships broke contact after a brief battle.

On 5 June, Ulysses chased the 32-gun Surveillante, under Jean-Marie de Villeneuve Cillart, off Saint-Domingue. Around 2130, Ulysses caught up with Surveillante, and a 2-hour and a half-battle ensued, after which the frigates broke contact.

Notes, citations, and references
Notes

Citations

Bibliography

1779 ships
Frigates of the Royal Navy